The 2010–11 Heineken Cup was the 16th season of the Heineken Cup, the annual rugby union European club competition for clubs from the top six nations in European rugby. It started with three matches on 8 October 2010 and ended on 21 May 2011 with the final at Cardiff's Millennium Stadium where Leinster beat Northampton Saints 33 – 22.

Teams
The default allocation of teams is as follows:
 England: 6 teams, based on performance in the Aviva Premiership and Anglo-Welsh Cup
 France: 6 teams, based on regular-season finish in the Top 14
 Ireland and Wales: 3 teams each, based on regular-season finish in the Celtic League
 Italy and Scotland: 2 teams each, based on participation in the Celtic League

The remaining two places are filled by the winners of the previous year's Heineken Cup and Amlin Challenge Cup. If the cup winners are already qualified through their domestic league, an additional team from their country will claim a Heineken Cup place (assuming another team is available). The only exception is when teams from England or France win both cups, which did not happen in 2009–10.

Because 2010 Heineken Cup winners Toulouse were already qualified for this season's Heineken Cup by virtue of their fourth-place regular-season finish in the 2009–10 Top 14, the extra place for France went to seventh-placed Biarritz (who were also Toulouse's defeated opponent in the Heineken Cup Final). Because Amlin Challenge Cup winners Cardiff Blues were already qualified for the Heineken Cup by finishing second among the four Welsh teams in the 2009–10 Celtic League, the extra Welsh place went to the lowest-placed Welsh team in the league, Scarlets.

Seeding
The seeding system was the same as in the 2009–10 tournament. The 24 competing teams are ranked based on past Heineken Cup and European Challenge Cup performance, with each pool receiving one team from each quartile, or Tier. The requirement to have only one team per country in each pool, however, still applies (with the exception of the inclusion of the seventh French team).

The brackets show each team's European Rugby Club Ranking at the end of the 2009–10 season. Aironi inherited the ranking of Viadana, the principal shareholders in the new Celtic League team.

Pool stage

The draw for the pool stage took place on 8 June 2010.

Under rules of the competition organiser, European Rugby Cup, tiebreakers within each pool are as follows.
 Competition points earned in head-to-head matches
 Total tries scored in head-to-head matches
 Point differential in head-to-head matches

ERC has four additional tiebreakers, used if tied teams are in different pools, or if the above steps cannot break a tie between teams in the same pool:
 Tries scored in all pool matches
 Point differential in all pool matches
 Best disciplinary record (fewest players receiving red or yellow cards in all pool matches)
 Coin toss

Pool 1

Pool 2

Pool 3

Pool 4

Pool 5

Pool 6

Seeding and runners-up
 Bare numbers indicate Heineken Cup quarterfinal seeding.
 Numbers with "C" indicate Challenge Cup quarterfinal seeding.

Knockout stage
The semi-final draw for both the Heineken Cup and Amlin Challenge Cup was conducted on 23 January at the press box of Adams Park in High Wycombe shortly after the London Wasps–Toulouse match.

All times are local times.

Quarter-finals

Semi-finals

Final

Individual statistics

Top points scorers
Final Standings
(correct as of 21 May 2011)

Top try scorers
Final Standings
(Correct as of 21 May 2011)

See also
2010–11 Amlin Challenge Cup

External links
Official ERC website

References

 
Heineken Cup seasons